"Yellow Roses" is a song written and recorded by American country music artist Dolly Parton.  It was released in July 1989 as the second single from the album White Limozeen.  The song was Parton's 23rd number one country single.  The single went to number one for one week and spent a total of 26 weeks on the country chart.

Chart performance

Year-end charts

References

1989 singles
Dolly Parton songs
Columbia Records singles
1989 songs
Songs written by Dolly Parton
Song recordings produced by Ricky Skaggs